Gabrielle LeDoux (born March 24, 1948) is an American politician and a former member of the Republican Party of the Alaska House of Representatives. She lives in Anchorage, Alaska. LeDoux is a former maritime attorney, having practiced law in Kodiak and Anchorage.

In March 2020, it was announced she has been charged with voter misconduct and unlawful interference with voting after an investigation by the FBI and the Alaska State Troopers.

Education and family
LeDoux went to La Mirada High School in La Mirada, California. She is a graduate of the University of California Berkeley (B.A. 1970) and the University of California, Berkeley School of Law (J.D. 1973). She also attended the University of Southern California (1966–1968). LeDoux moved to Alaska in 1978, first living in Anchorage before moving to Kodiak in 1980. LeDoux's husband (Kurt) and youngest son (Daniel) died in a car accident in 1992. She has two other children, Matthew and Sheree, and two grandchildren, Cuauhtemoc and Bjorn.

Political career
LeDoux ran for State House as a Democrat in Kodiak in 2000, losing in the general election to Gary Stevens by a 44 percent to 55 percent margin. LeDoux served as Mayor of the Kodiak Island Borough March 2001 through October 2004. LeDoux was then elected to the Alaska House of Representatives in 2004. Taking office in January 2005, she served two terms in the Alaska State Legislature, through January 2009 and was a recipient of the Toll Fellowship in 2006. While in the legislature LeDoux served as co-chair of both the Fisheries and the Community and Regional Affairs Committees. She was also a member of the Labor and Commerce, and Resources committees.

In October 2007, LeDoux announced her candidacy for the United States House of Representatives in Alaska's At-large congressional district in 2008, challenging 18-term congressman Don Young and Lieutenant Governor Sean Parnell. LeDoux was dubbed a spoiler and placed a distant third in the primary, garnering less than 10 percent of the vote. The only part of the state she carried was her former legislative district, by a plurality. Ledoux said in July 2009 that she would not run again in 2010 if Young sought re-election.

After her second term in the house ended in January 2009, LeDoux moved to east Anchorage from Kodiak Island in 2009, and ran for State House in her new district in the 2010 elections. She lost to Pete Petersen in the general election by 5 percent (47 percent to 52 percent). In 2012, LeDoux's presumptive Democratic opponent withdrew after winning an uncontested primary, and was replaced by Kay Rollison. LeDoux beat Rollison in the general election. She defeated retired colonel Laurie Hummel to represent District 15 (East Anchorage) in 2014 (52 percent to 47 percent). LeDoux is her own single largest campaign contributor, by a factor of more than 10 times.

After being elected in 2016 to her 5th non-consecutive term in the state house, LeDoux joined a majority coalition of Democrats, Independents and two other Republicans, with an avowed goal of ameliorating the state's budget deficit, the latter a product of declining oil revenues, budgeting, and prior taxation restructuring. LeDoux was chosen to chair the house Rules Committee. Alaska state Republican Party chair, Tuckerman Babcock, informed LeDoux by letter that the party will recruit and support a primary opponent against her in 2018. After joining the majority coalition in 2016, LeDoux expressed confidence that she would be representing the needs of her constituents saying "We're hired to do a job, and the purpose of our job is not to keep our job. It's to actually do something.".

Voter Fraud Accusations
In 2018, she first won the Republican primary with 57% of the votes against Aaron Weaver and then the general election with 42% of the votes against democrat Lyn Franks (35%) and write-in candidate Jake Sloan (24%).

In March 2020, the Alaska Department of Law accused LeDoux of Election Misconduct after a two-year investigation which included the FBI.

Political views and accomplishments

Families and children
LeDoux is known for her sponsorship and passage of the 2008 "Safe Haven" Bill which allows parents to surrender newborns without prosecution. In 2018, she wrote and sponsored family court legislation establishing a rebuttable presumption favoring equal time shared parenting as being in the best interest of the child after divorce, unless there is child abuse or neglect.

Public safety
For the 2019 legislative session, LeDoux is one of several sponsors of a bill to enact mandatory jail time for car theft. She has commented that by changing the law to strengthen penalties we will send a clear message that this kind of lawless behavior will not be tolerated.

Community service

 Kodiak Launch Complex Advisory Board
 Alaska Municipal League, former Board Member 
 Alaska Bar Association, Member
 Maritime Law Association, former Member 
 Alaska Chamber of Commerce, Member

References

External links
 http://www.adn.com/elections/story/432682.html
 Gabrielle Ledoux | The Next Right
 Gabrielle LeDoux at 100 Years of Alaska's Legislature

1948 births
Alaska lawyers
Living people
Mayors of places in Alaska
Republican Party members of the Alaska House of Representatives
Politicians from Anchorage, Alaska
Politicians from Baltimore
People from Kodiak, Alaska
Women mayors of places in Alaska
Women state legislators in Alaska
American women lawyers
UC Berkeley School of Law alumni
University of California, Berkeley alumni
21st-century American politicians
21st-century American women politicians
Candidates in the 2008 United States elections